Eden is a village in Fond du Lac County, Wisconsin, United States. The population was 875 at the 2010 census. The village is located within the Town of Eden.

History
A post office called Eden was first established in 1850. Eden was named after either the Garden of Eden or after John Eden, an early settler.

Geography
Eden is located at  (43.693077, -88.361805).

Demographics

2010 census
As of the census of 2010, there were 875 people, 337 households, and 235 families living in the village. The racial makeup of the village was 94.5% White, 0.2% African American, 0.7% Native American, 0.3% Asian, 2.6% from other races, and 1.6% from two or more races. Hispanic or Latino of any race were 4.7% of the population.

There were 337 households, of which 35.6% had children under the age of 18 living with them, 55.5% were married couples living together, 8.3% had a female householder with no husband present, 5.9% had a male householder with no wife present, and 30.3% were non-families. 24.3% of all households were made up of individuals, and 9.2% had someone living alone who was 65 years of age or older. The average household size was 2.60 and the average family size was 3.09.

The median age in the village was 34.3 years. 25.5% of residents were under the age of 18; 11.4% were between the ages of 18 and 24; 26.8% were from 25 to 44; 23.6% were from 45 to 64; and 12.8% were 65 years of age or older. The gender makeup of the village was 50.2% male and 49.8% female.

2000 census
As of the census of 2000, there were 687 people, 264 households, and 181 families living in the village. The population density was 1,321.2 people per square mile (510.1/km2). There were 303 housing units at an average density of 582.7 per square mile (225.0/km2). The racial makeup of the village was 98.11% White, 0.15% Native American, 1.46% from other races, and 0.29% from two or more races. 4.22% of the population were Hispanic or Latino of any race.

There were 264 households, out of which 35.2% had children under the age of 18 living with them, 58.7% were married couples living together, 7.2% had a female householder with no husband present, and 31.1% were non-families. 25.0% of all households were made up of individuals, and 10.2% had someone living alone who was 65 years of age or older. The average household size was 2.60 and the average family size was 3.16.

In the village, the population was spread out, with 30.4% under the age of 18, 6.6% from 18 to 24, 31.9% from 25 to 44, 17.5% from 45 to 64, and 13.7% who were 65 years of age or older. The median age was 34 years. For every 100 females, there were 102.7 males. For every 100 females age 18 and over, there were 98.3 males.

The median income for a household in the village was $41,579, and the median income for a family was $48,571. Males had a median income of $35,804 versus $22,031 for females. The per capita income for the village was $19,614. About 3.4% of families and 4.2% of the population were below the poverty line, including 6.5% of those under age 18 and 5.8% of those age 65 or over.

Notable people

Warren Braun, Wisconsin politician
Justus DaLee, folk artist
Jim Gantner, baseball player
Rick Gudex, Wisconsin politician
Joseph H. Hardgrove, Wisconsin politician and physician
Kurt W. Schuller, Wisconsin politician

Images

References

Villages in Fond du Lac County, Wisconsin
Villages in Wisconsin
1850 establishments in Wisconsin